Long Creek is an unincorporated community and census-designated place (CDP) in Williams County, North Dakota, United States. It was first listed as a CDP prior to the 2020 census.

The CDP is on the southern edge of Williams County, on the northern shore of Lake Sakakawea, a large reservoir on the Missouri River. The community sits between two inlets to the lake: Long Creek to the north and Chris Creek to the south. Lewis and Clark State Park is to the north, across Long Creek. The CDP is bordered to the west by 119th Road NW.

Demographics

Education
It is in the Williston Basin School District 7. Williston High School is the zoned high school.

It was formerly in the Williams County School District 8 (formerly New School District). The district only served grades K-8 and high school students were sent to Williston High, then in the Williston Public School District 1. District 8 also sent high school students to the Nesson School District in Ray and to the Tioga School District in Tioga. In 2021 District 8 merged with District 1 into the Williston Basin School District 7.

References 

Census-designated places in Williams County, North Dakota
Census-designated places in North Dakota